Pedobacter soli is a species of Gram-negative bacteria, first isolated from rhizosphere soil of Brassica campestris, hence its name. Its type strain is 15-51(T) (=KACC 14939(T) =NBRC 107691(T)).

References

Further reading
Whitman, William B., et al., eds. Bergey's manual® of systematic bacteriology. Vol. 5. Springer, 2012.

External links

LPSN
Type strain of Pedobacter soli at BacDive -  the Bacterial Diversity Metadatabase

Sphingobacteriia
Bacteria described in 2011